Cravant is a former commune in the Yonne department in Bourgogne-Franche-Comté in north-central France. On 1 January 2017, it was merged into the new commune Deux Rivières.

In 1423, during the Hundred Years' War , it was the site of the Battle of Cravant between Anglo-Burgundian and Franco-Scots forces.

See also
Communes of the Yonne department

References

Former communes of Yonne